The Tacoma Mall is the largest shopping center in Tacoma, Washington, and is owned and operated by the Simon Property Group. Anchor tenants include Dick's Sporting Goods, JCPenney (originally two levels, but added a third level in 1986), Macy's (originally The Bon Marché), and Nordstrom, with one vacant anchor last occupied by Sears, which opened in 1981. The mall opened on October 13, 1965. Another former anchor was Liberty House, which opened in 1974 (briefly Liberty House/Rhodes, with the Rhodes name later dropped, later Frederick & Nelson, then Mervyn's), which was demolished for the current location of Nordstrom, which relocated from an anchor that was originally Nordstrom Best, with the Best name dropped in 1972, and expanded from 55,000 square feet to 134,000 square feet in 1983, in 2008. The former Nordstrom was divided into Sephora, Apple Store, and Forever 21 in 2010. Forever 21 relocated to a smaller location in 2016, and the former location became a Dick's Sporting Goods in 2017.

On May 31, 2018, it was announced that Sears would be closing as part of a plan to close 72 stores nationwide. The store closed on September 2, 2018.

2005 shooting

On November 20, 2005, 20-year-old Dominick Sergio Maldonado opened fire inside the mall, wounding six people. One of them was seriously injured. Maldonado took four people hostage but surrendered without further incident to SWAT. In 2007, Maldonado was sentenced to 163 years in prison.

Anchors
Macy's, Opened August 1964 as The Bon Marche, Identical to Westfield Southcenter's Macy's, which opened in August '68.

JCPenney, Opened October 1965 shortly after the Northgate Mall's JCPenney.

Nordstrom, Opened as Best's in 1965, relocated to its own building in 1983, moved to former Mervyn's in 2008.

Sears, Opened in 1981, announced closure in May 2018, closed September 2, 2018, demolished April 7, 2019.

Mervyn's Opened in 1993 in former Liberty House/Frederick & Nelson, closed in 2006 due to Nordstrom moving and financial issues.

References

External links
Tacoma Mall Official Site

Buildings and structures in Tacoma, Washington
Tourist attractions in Tacoma, Washington
Shopping malls in Pierce County, Washington
Shopping malls established in 1965